Monique Currie (born February 25, 1983) is a former American basketball player for the Washington Mystics of the Women's National Basketball Association (WNBA). She retired on February 26, 2019, and will now work for Nike.

Currie was traded from the Chicago Sky during the 2007 season in exchange for Chasity Melvin. The Sky had selected her with the first pick of the 2007 WNBA Dispersal Draft from the roster of the defunct Charlotte Sting. Currie signed with the Phoenix Mercury on February 5, 2015. On February 1, 2018, Currie signed to return to the Washington Mystics, where she had previously spent 8 years of her WNBA career.

Born in Washington, D.C., Currie went to high school at the Bullis School in Potomac, Maryland, where she was a Gatorade All-American. Currie attended Duke University, where she became an All-American.  Throughout her college career, she scored over 1,500 points. She was the third overall pick in the 2006 WNBA Draft.

Duke statistics
Source

USA Basketball

Currie was named to the USA Women's U19 team which represented the US in the 2001 U19 World's Championship, held in Brno, Czech Republic in July 2001. Currie scored 3.2 points per game, and helped the USA team to a 6–1 record and the bronze medal.

Currie also played on the team representing the US at the 2005 World University Games held in Izmir, Turkey. The team won all seven games to earn the gold medal. Currie scored 8.9 points per game.

Overseas
2006-2007:  Elitzur Ramla
2010-2011:  Galatasaray Medical Park
2011-2012:  Homend Antakya
2012:  CSM Târgovişte
2013:  Perfumerias Avenida

References

External links

Player Biography

1983 births
Living people
All-American college women's basketball players
American expatriate basketball people in Romania
American expatriate basketball people in Spain
American expatriate basketball people in Turkey
American women's basketball players
Basketball players from Washington, D.C.
Charlotte Sting players
Chicago Sky players
Club Sportiv Municipal Târgoviște players
Duke Blue Devils women's basketball players
Galatasaray S.K. (women's basketball) players
Phoenix Mercury players
San Antonio Stars players
Shooting guards
Universiade gold medalists for the United States
Universiade medalists in basketball
Washington Mystics players
United States women's national basketball team players